The history of the Caucasus region may be divided by geography into the history of the North Caucasus (Ciscaucasia), historically in the sphere of influence of Scythia and of Southern Russia (Eastern Europe), and that of the South Caucasus (Transcaucasia; Caucasian Albania, Georgia, Armenia, Azerbaijan) in the sphere of influence of Persia, Anatolia, and (for a very brief time) Assyria.

Throughout history, Southern Caucasus and parts of the North Caucasus have come under the control of various empires, including the Achaemenid, Neo-Assyrian Empire, Parthian, Roman, Sassanian, Byzantine, Mongol, Ottoman, and successive Iranian (Safavid, Afsharid, and Qajar). In 1813 and 1828 by the Treaty of Gulistan and the Treaty of Turkmenchay respectively, Qajar Iran officially ceded its territories in the Caucasus in what is now Dagestan, eastern Georgia, Azerbaijan, and Armenia to the Russian Empire. Russia conquered and annexed the rest of the Northern Caucasus in the course of the 19th century in the Caucasian Wars (1817–1864).

The Northern Caucasus became the scene of intense fighting during the Second World War. Nazi Germany attempted to capture the Caucasus region of Soviet Union in 1942 by a two-pronged attack towards both the western bank of the Volga (intended to seize the city of Stalingrad) and southeast towards Baku, a major center of oil production. Some parts of the Northern Caucasus fell under German occupation, but the Axis invasion eventually faltered as it failed to accomplish either goal, and Soviet soldiers drove the Germans back west following the Battle of Stalingrad (1942–1943).

Following the dissolution of the Soviet Union at the end of the Cold War, Armenia, Azerbaijan, and Georgia became independent nations. The Caucasus region has become the setting of territorial disputes in the post-Soviet era, which lead to the establishment of unrecognized states of Artsakh, Abkhazia, and South Ossetia.

Early history

The Caucasus region gradually enters the historical record during the Late Bronze Age to Early Iron Age. Hayasa-Azzi was a Late Bronze Age confederation of two kingdoms of Armenian Highlands, Hayasa located South of Trabzon and Azzi, located north of the Euphrates and to the south of Hayasa. The Hayasa-Azzi confederation was in conflict with the Hittite Empire in the 14th century BC, leading up to the collapse of Hatti around 1190 BCArme-Shupria was a Hurrian kingdom, known from Assyrian sources beginning in the 13th century BC, located in what is now known as the Armenian Highlands, to the southwest of Lake Van, bordering on Ararat proper. The capital was called Ubbumu. The Diauehi were a tribal confederation in northeastern Anatolia in the post-Hittite period, mentioned in Urartian inscriptions.  Diauehi is a possible locus of Proto-Kartvelian; it has been described as an "important tribal formation of possible proto-Georgians" by Ronald Grigor Suny (1994), although other scholars have suggested that it may have been proto-Armenian (based on the etymology of the name). At the same time, during the 13th to 9th centuries BC, the Nairi appear in Assyrian and Hittite records. The Battle of Nihriya (c. 1230 BC) was the culmination of Hittite-Assyrian hostilities.

The Kingdom of Urartu rose to power in the mid-9th century BC
and flourished for two centuries before it was absorbed into the Median Empire in the early 6th century BC, followed by the conquest by the Achaemenid Empire.

The Northern Caucasus enters the historical record later, being in cultural contact with the Pontic steppe. The Koban culture (ca. 1100 to 400 BC) is a late Bronze Age and Iron Age culture of the northern and central Caucasus. Its end presumably correlates with the Scythian expansion in the region.

Classical Antiquity

 Urartu
 Kingdom of Colchis
 Persia
 Media (728 BC – 549 BC)
 Achaemenid Empire (c. 550 BC – 330 BC)
 Parthia (247 BC – AD 224)
 Sassanid Empire (224 – 651 AD)
 Neo-Assyrian Empire (911 to 609 BC)
 Kingdom of Armenia
 Orontid Armenia (336 BC - 200 BC)
 Artashesian Armenia (190 BC - 2 BC)
 Arshakuni Armenia (52 AD - 428 AD)
 Kingdom of Caucasian Albania
 Kingdom of Caucasian Iberia
 Kingdom of Lazica-Egrisi.
 Roman Empire (114 – 117 AD)

Middle Ages
During the Middle Ages Bagratid Armenia, Kingdom of Tashir-Dzoraget, Kingdom of Syunik, and Principality of Khachen organized local Armenian population facing multiple threats after the fall of antique Kingdom of Armenia.

Caucasian Albania maintained close ties with Armenia and the Church of Caucasian Albania shared same Christian dogmas with the Armenian Apostolic Church and had a tradition of their Catholicos being ordained through the Patriarch of Armenia.
 Sassanian Empire (224 – 651)
 Byzantine Empire (330 – 1453)
 Khazars
 Arab Caliphates
 Rashidun Caliphate (632 – 661)
 Umayyad Caliphate (661 – 750)
 Abbasid Caliphate (750 – 1258)
 Kingdom of Georgia (1008 – 1490)
 Kingdom of Abkhazia (767 – 1014)
 Kingdom of Tao-Klarjeti (888 – 1008)
 Kingdom of Kakheti-Hereti (1020s – 1104)
 Kingdom of Imereti (1260 – 1810)
 Samtskhe-Saatabago (1266 – 1625)
 Kingdom of Kakheti (1465 – 1762)
 Kingdom of Kartli (1466 – 1762)
 Persia
 Sallarids
 Sajids
 Shirvanshah
 Kingdom of Armenia (Middle Ages)
 Seljuq dynasty (1037 – 1194)
 Ilkhanate (1256 – 1335)
 Timurid dynasty (1370 – 1526)

Early modern history

By the end of the 15th century, the Kingdom of Georgia was fragmented into a number of petty client kingdoms subject to either Persia (Kingdom of Kakheti, Kingdom of Kartli) or the Ottomans (Kingdom of Imereti). Throughout the 16th century, the Caucasus continued to serve as a battleground between Persian and Ottoman forces, with the two great powers attempting to gain control over the region. From the 1530s to the 1550s, several Transcaucasian cities became the focal point of these imperial divides. In 1555, this culminated in the Peace of Amasya, whereby Ottoman and Persian forces agreed to establish formal spheres of influence in the region.  As a result of the Treaty, the Safavid Empire (Persia) assumed control over lands East of the Surami Highlands, including the Georgian kingdoms of Kartli and Kakheti. The Ottomans received areas West of the Highlands, including the Georgian kingdom of Imereti. The nascent Russian Empire gained territories in the North Caucasus in the Russo-Persian war of 1722/3. These territories were ceded back to Persia a few years later. Following the death of Nader Shah, Kartli and Kakheti were merged into the Kingdom of Kartli-Kakheti in 1762; Erekle de facto seceded from Persian overlordship, but still de jure recognized the Persians as his suzerain. In 1783, King Erekle II concluded the Treaty of Georgievsk with the Russian Empire. Catherine the Great tried to use Georgia as a base of operations against both Iran and the Ottoman Empire. After her death, the Russians withdrew to the North Caucasus Line. The Qajar dynasty re-established Persia's traditional suzerainty over the Caucasus. A Persian invasion force defeated the Georgian army in the Battle of Krtsanisi in 1795. In 1801, a few years after the assassination of Agha Mohammad Khan, capitalizing on the eruption of instability in Iran, the Russians annexed eastern Georgia (Kartli-Kakheti).

While Georgia and Armenia remained Christian, the Chechens gradually adopted Sunni Islam. The Circassians were mostly Islamized under the influence of the Crimean Tatars and the Ottoman Empire in the 17th century.

Modern history

Russian Empire and Civil War
 Georgia within the Russian Empire (1801 – 1918)
 Russo-Persian War (1804 – 13)
 Treaty of Kurakchay (1805)
 Treaty of Gulistan (1813)
 Russo-Persian War (1826–28)
 Treaty of Turkmenchay (1828)
 Caucasian War (1817 – 1864)
 Ethnic cleansing of Circassians
 Caucasus Campaign
 Russian Civil War
 Volunteer Army (1918 – 1920)
 Kuban People's Republic (1918 – 1920)
 Mountainous Republic of the Northern Caucasus (1917 – 1922)
 Democratic Republic of Georgia (1918 – 1921)
 Transcaucasian Democratic Federative Republic

Soviet Union
 Soviet Union
 Transcaucasian Socialist Federative Soviet Republic
 Armenian Soviet Socialist Republic
 Georgian Soviet Socialist Republic
 Azerbaijan Soviet Socialist Republic
 First Nagorno-Karabakh War (1988 – 1994)
 Ossetian-Ingush conflict (1989 – 1991)
 Chechen Republic of Ichkeria (1991 – 2000)
 Republic of Georgia (since 1991)
 Armenia (since 1991)
 Republic of Azerbaijan (since 1991)

Recent history (1991–present)
 War in Abkhazia (1992–1993)
 First Chechen War, 1994 – 1996
 Second Chechen War, 1999 – 2006
 Russo-Georgian War, 2008
 2020 Nagorno-Karabakh War

See also
 Caucasus Greeks
 North Caucasus
 South Caucasus
 History of Georgia (country)
 History of Armenia
 History of Azerbaijan
 History of Abkhazia
 History of Chechnya
 History of Nagorno-Karabakh
 History of Nakhchivan
 Southern Russia
 Eastern Magyars
 North Caucasian Huns
 Huns
 Khazars
 Western Turkic Khaganate

Further reading 
 Asmus, Ronald. A Little War that Shook the World: Georgia, Russia, and the Future of the West. NYU (2010). 
 de Waal, Thomas. Black Garden. NYU (2003). 
 Gasimov, Zaur: "The Caucasus", European History Online, Mainz: Institute of European History, 2011, retrieved: November 18, 2011.
 Goltz, Thomas. Azerbaijan Diary: A Rogue Reporter's Adventures in an Oil-Rich, War-Torn, Post-Soviet Republic. M E Sharpe (1998). 
 Goltz, Thomas. Chechnya Diary: A War Correspondent's Story of Surviving the War in Chechnya. M E Sharpe (2003). 
 Goltz, Thomas. Georgia Diary: A Chronicle of War and Political Chaos in the Post-Soviet Caucasus. Thomas Dunne Books (2003). 
 Shapi, Kaziev. Caucasian highlanders (Повседневная жизнь горцев Северного Кавказа в XIX в.). Everyday life of the Caucasian highlanders. 19th century (In the co-authorship with I.Karpeev).  "Molodaya Gvardiy" publishers. Moscow, 2003. 
 Kovalevskaia, V. B. "Central Ciscaucasia in Antiquity and Early Middle Ages: Caucasian Substratum and Migrations of the Iranic-Speaking Tribes." (1988).

Notes

 
History of Eastern Europe
Western Asia